Davlyatovka (Däwlät) is a rural locality (a village) in Petropavlovsky Selsoviet, Askinsky District, Bashkortostan, Russia. The population was 129 as of 2010. There are 3 streets.

Geography 
Davlyatovka is located 11 km west of Askino (the district's administrative centre) by road. Petropavlovka is the nearest rural locality.

References 

Rural localities in Askinsky District